Cane is any of various tall, perennial grasses with flexible, woody stalks from the genera Arundinaria, and Arundo

Scientifically speaking, they are either of two genera from the family Poaceae.  The genus Arundo is native from the Mediterranean Basin to the Far East. The genus Arundinaria is a bamboo (Bambuseae) found in the New World. Neither genus includes sugarcane (genus Saccharum, tribe Andropogoneae).

Cane commonly grows in large riparian stands known as canebrakes, found in toponyms throughout the Southern and Western United States; they are much like the tules (Schoenoplectus acutus) of California.

Depending on strength, cane can be fashioned for various purposes, including walking sticks, crutches, assistive canes, and judicial or school canes. Where canes are used in corporal punishment, they must meet particular specifications, such as a high degree of flexibility. Cane historically has been used for many other purposes, such as baskets, furniture, boats, roofs and wherever stiff, withy sticks can be put to good use.

Etymology

Other uses
Cane is used for a variety of artistic and practical purposes, such as Native American baskets of North America. During the 18th and early 19th century, non-commissioned officers in some European armies could carry canes to discipline troops (when not in use, the cane was hooked to a cross-belt or a button). Cane is used to describe furniture made of wicker.

See also
Caneworking
Caning (furniture)

References

External links

 Germplasm Resources Information Network: Arundo
 Erowid Arundo Donax vault
 Fashionable Walking Canes & Walking Sticks — History of Canes Page Info (reprinted with permission)
 Description of Arundinaria
Walking-Stick Papers (Robert Cortes Holliday, 1918) — Project Gutenberg ebook
 Modern cane fighting based on Oriental techniques
 Reprinted early 1900s information about the Vigny cane and associated techniques

Poaceae
Arundinoideae
Energy crops
Plant common names